Mr. & Mrs. Smith is an upcoming American spy comedy television series created by Donald Glover and Francesca Sloane, based on the 2005 film of the same name. It stars Glover and Maya Erskine.

Synopsis
John and Jane Smith enter into a new phase of their marriage after agreeing to work as spies for a mysterious agency.

Cast
 Donald Glover as John Smith
 Maya Erskine as Jane Smith
 Parker Posey
 Wagner Moura
 Michaela Coel
 John Turturro
 Paul Dano

Production
On February 12, 2021, it was announced that a TV series reboot based on the original film, created by and starring Donald Glover and Phoebe Waller-Bridge, with Francesca Sloane as co-creator and showrunner, would premiere on Prime Video in 2022. The original film was directed by Doug Liman and starred Brad Pitt and Angelina Jolie. Waller-Bridge exited the project in September 2021. On April 7, 2022, it was reported that Maya Erskine would take over Waller-Bridge's role.

On June 29, 2022, it was reported that Michaela Coel, John Turturro, and Paul Dano would appear in guest star roles. On September 22, 2022, it was reported that Parker Posey and Wagner Moura had joined the cast in recurring roles.

In addition to Glover and Sloane, the series will be executive produced by Yariv Milchan, Arnon Milchan, Michael Schaefer, Stephen Glover, Anthony Katagas, Hiro Murai, Nate Matteson, and Jenny Robins. 

Filming began in the summer of 2022. On September 23, 2022, it was reported that the release date for the series had been pushed back from 2022 to 2023.

References

External links 
 

English-language television shows
Upcoming comedy television series
Amazon Prime Video original programming
Live action television shows based on films
Television series by Amazon Studios